The Mgbo language, 'Mgbolizhia', is an Igboid language spoken by the Mgbo people in Ebonyi state in Nigeria. It forms a dialect cluster with closely related Izii, Ezza, and Ikwo languages though they are only marginally mutually intelligible.

References

Igbo language